The Last Chair Violinist is the tenth solo studio album by American hip hop recording artist SPM, and his third since the start of his 45-year incarceration in 2002. It features guest appearances by Juan Gotti, Baby Bash, Lucky Luciano, Carolyn Rodriguez and others. The CD consists of 17 songs, including the hit single "Mexican Heaven", and also contains a bonus disc of Coy's songs that have been on previous albums. The Last Chair Violinist was released on November 18, 2008 via Dope House Records.

The album peaked at number 59 on the US Billboard 200 chart.

Track listing

Bonus Disc

Chart history

References

External links
The Last Chair Violinist on Discogs
The Last Chair Violinist on iTunes

2008 albums
South Park Mexican albums